Rašeta is a Serbian and Croatian surname. Notable people with this surname include:

 (born 1934), Yugoslavian military commander
Boško Rašeta, a leader of the Srb uprising
Marija Rašeta Vukosavljević, Serbian statesman

Serbian surnames
Croatian surnames